

Baharistan-i-shahi is a chronicle of medieval Kashmir. The Persian manuscript was written by an anonymous author, presumably in 1614. 

The work was translated into English by Kashinath Pandit (Punjab University, Teheran University), former director at the Center of Central Asian Studies at the University of Kashmir.

See also
Tohfatu'l-Ahbab

References

Further reading
 
 Pandit, K. N. (2013). Baharistan-i-shahi: A chronicle of mediaeval Kashmir. Srinagar: Gulshan Books.

External links
Baharistan-i-Shahi
A chronicle of Kashmir
The Baharistan-i-shahi and Kashmir
History of Kashmir
History of Pakistan
History books about India
1610s books
17th-century Indian books
Kashmiri literature
Pakistani literature